Anthelea (Ancient Greek: Ἀνθήλεια), in Greek mythology, is one of the Danaïdes, daughter of Danaus and Polyxo. She married (and murdered) Cisseus, son of Aegyptus and Caliadne.

Note

Reference 

 Apollodorus, The Library with an English Translation by Sir James George Frazer, F.B.A., F.R.S. in 2 Volumes, Cambridge, MA, Harvard University Press; London, William Heinemann Ltd. 1921. ISBN 0-674-99135-4. Online version at the Perseus Digital Library. Greek text available from the same website.

Princesses in Greek mythology
Danaids